Carl Ludwig von Oesfeld (4 March 1741 – 4 November 1804) was the Royal Prussian Privy Councillor and a German cartographer.

Oesfeld's father Johann Friedrich Oesfeld was a preacher in Berlin and Potsdam, and his brother Frederick William was a lawyer in Frankfurt. Carl Ludwig Oesfeld himself practiced the profession of a country cartographer, topographer, military writer and illustrator in the engineer corps. He trained the cartographer Daniel Friedrich Sotzmann in 1772. In 1786 he was knighted along with his brother, and in 1788 then appointed Privy Councillor. Oesfeld also collected maps and prints. His son Karl Wilhelm von Oesfeld also worked as a cartographer and topographer.

References
 M. v. Oesfeld. Oesfeld, Karl Wilhelm von. In: General German Biography (ADB). Belt 24 Oxford University Press, Leipzig 1887, pp. 470–472. [Carl Ludwig is also discussed]
 Klaus Arlt: Oesfeld, Carl Ludwig von. In: Friedrich Beck and Eckart Henning (ed.): Brandenburg Biographical Dictionary (= single publication of the Historical Commission Brandenburg eV, Volume 5). Publisher of Berlin-Brandenburg, Potsdam, 2002, p 300, 
 Winfried Bliss: Carl Ludwig von Oesfeld. In: Friends for Cartographica in the Prussian Cultural Heritage Foundation eV: Releases. Issue 18, 2005, pp. 6–16, ISSN 1612-9512

German cartographers
1741 births
1804 deaths